Saros series 132 for lunar eclipses occurs at the moon's ascending node, repeating 18 years 11 and 1/3 days. It contains 71 member events, with 12 total eclipses, starting in 2015 and ending in 2213.

List

See also 
 List of lunar eclipses
 List of Saros series for lunar eclipses

Notes

External links 
 www.hermit.org: Saros 132

Lunar saros series